Robert Smizik is a former sportswriter and columnist for the Pittsburgh Post-Gazette. Smizik was bought out of his contract by the Post-Gazette in mid-December 2008, then retiring from his duties as a full-time columnist for the paper.  He covered Pittsburgh and National sports topics on a locally popular blog hosted at the Post-Gazette's website until October 14, 2015, when he announced that his writing days were behind him in a final article. 
  
Smizik was originally hired by the Pittsburgh Press in June 1969 and was a beat reporter for both the Pittsburgh Pirates, 1972–77 and the Pitt football and basketball, 1978-82  during the first few decades of his career. He became a columnist in 1983.  He is a native of Pittsburgh and graduated from Peabody High School and the University of Pittsburgh.

Smizik became popular in the 1990s for his appearances on many Pittsburgh sports shows including Sportsbeat.

References

External links
Archive of Smizik's columns for the Pittsburgh Post-Gazette
Smizik's blog at post-gazette.com

American sports journalists
Living people
University of Pittsburgh alumni
Writers from Pittsburgh
American columnists
Pittsburgh Post-Gazette people
Journalists from Pennsylvania
Year of birth missing (living people)